Schlattingen railway station is a railway station in Schlattingen, in the Swiss canton of Thurgau. It is an intermediate stop on the Lake line and is served by local trains only.

Services 
Schlattingen is served by the S1 of the St. Gallen S-Bahn:

 : half-hourly service between Schaffhausen and Wil via St. Gallen.

References

External links 
 
 

Railway stations in the canton of Thurgau
Swiss Federal Railways stations